S-Bhf. Greifswalder Straße is a railway station in the Prenzlauer Berg district of Berlin.

References

Griefswalder
Griefswalder
Griefswalder Strasse
Railway stations in Germany opened in 1929